Eli Landsem (born 22 March 1962) is a Norwegian former international footballer who was the coach of the Norway women's national football team between 2009 and 2012.

Career
As a player, Landsem won 15 caps for Norway, scoring one goal. She made her Norway debut at the age of 17, and went on to play in the 1984 European Competition for Women's Football, Norway's first UEFA tournament appearance. At club level Landsem played for Asker and collected three First Division winner's medals and two Norwegian Women's Cup winner's medals.

From 1994 until 1996 Landsem coached Rælingen in 3. divisjon, the regionalised fourth tier of men's football in Norway. She was the first female to coach a male team at such a high level of the Norwegian football league system.

Landsem replaced Bjarne Berntsen as national team coach in October 2009. She qualified the team for the 2011 FIFA Women's World Cup in Germany, but Norway crashed out in the first round. Results did not improve and a review carried out by Football Association of Norway's (NFF) Nils Johan Semb revealed that some players were unhappy with Landsem. Her contract was not renewed beyond 31 December 2012 and veteran Even Pellerud returned to the role.

From November 2014 to March 2015 she managed another men's team, Fjellhamar FK, but resigned due to lack of available players. Ahead of the 2018 season she was named director of sports of Vålerenga Fotball Damer.

International appearances

International goals
Scores and results list Norway's goal tally first.

References

External links

 
  
 CV at Football Association of Norway 

1962 births
Living people
People from Rindal
Norwegian women's footballers
Norway women's international footballers
Asker Fotball (women) players
Toppserien players
Norway women's national football team managers
2011 FIFA Women's World Cup managers
Norwegian women's football managers
Norwegian expatriate football managers
Norwegian expatriate sportspeople in Denmark
Expatriate football managers in Denmark
Women's association football defenders
Female association football managers
Vålerenga Fotball non-playing staff
Sportspeople from Møre og Romsdal